Trail of the Silver Spurs is a 1941 American Western film directed by S. Roy Luby and written by Earle Snell. The film is the fourth in Monogram Pictures' "Range Busters" series, and it stars Ray "Crash" Corrigan as Crash, John "Dusty" King as Dusty and Max "Alibi" Terhune as Alibi, with I. Stanford Jolley, Dorothy Short and Milburn Morante. The film was released on January 4, 1941, by Monogram Pictures.

Plot

Cast
Ray "Crash" Corrigan as Crash Corrigan
John 'Dusty' King as Dusty King
Max Terhune as Alibi Terhune 
I. Stanford Jolley as The Jingler
Dorothy Short as Nancy Nordick
Milburn Morante as Dan Nordick 
George Chesebro as Wilson
Eddie Dean as Stoner

See also
The Range Busters series:

 The Range Busters (1940)
 Trailing Double Trouble (1940)
 West of Pinto Basin (1940)
 Trail of the Silver Spurs (1941)
 The Kid's Last Ride (1941)
 Tumbledown Ranch in Arizona (1941)
 Wrangler's Roost (1941)
 Fugitive Valley (1941)
 Saddle Mountain Roundup (1941)
 Tonto Basin Outlaws (1941)
 Underground Rustlers (1941)
 Thunder River Feud (1942)
 Rock River Renegades (1942)
 Boot Hill Bandits (1942)
 Texas Trouble Shooters (1942)
 Arizona Stage Coach (1942)
 Texas to Bataan (1942)
 Trail Riders (1942)
 Two Fisted Justice (1943)
 Haunted Ranch (1943)
 Land of Hunted Men (1943)
 Cowboy Commandos (1943)
 Black Market Rustlers (1943)
 Bullets and Saddles (1943)

References

External links
 

1941 films
1940s English-language films
American Western (genre) films
1941 Western (genre) films
Monogram Pictures films
American black-and-white films
Films directed by S. Roy Luby
Range Busters
1940s American films